Pygmaeconus traillii is a species of sea snail, a marine gastropod mollusk in the family Conidae, the cone snails and their allies.

Like all species within the genus Conus, these snails are predatory and venomous. They are capable of "stinging" humans, therefore live ones should be handled carefully or not at all.

Description
The size of the shell varies between 5 mm and 8 mm.

Distribution
This marine species occurs in the Strait of Malacca to the Philippines.

References

 Filmer R.M. (2001). A Catalogue of Nomenclature and Taxonomy in the Living Conidae 1758 - 1998. Backhuys Publishers, Leiden. 388pp.
 Tucker J.K. & Tenorio M.J. (2009) Systematic classification of Recent and fossil conoidean gastropods. Hackenheim: Conchbooks. 296 pp.
 Monnier E., Limpalaër L., Robin A. & Roux C. (2018). A taxonomic iconography of living Conidae. Harxheim: ConchBooks. 2 vols. 1205 pp.

External links
 Adams A. (1855). Description of two new genera and several new species of Mollusca, from the collection of Hugh Cuming, Esq
 
 The Conus Biodiversity website
 Cone Shells – Knights of the Sea
 
 

traillii
Gastropods described in 1855